Kamrar is a city in Hamilton County, Iowa, United States. The population was 179 at the time of the 2020 census.

History
Kamrar was platted in 1881. The city was named in honor of Judge J. M. Kamrar, a prominent lawyer of the vicinity, who served as an officer of the Chicago & Northwestern Railway Company. J. M. Kamrar resided in Blue Earth, Minnesota in his final years, where he was among the first citizens to own a car. There is a statue of memorial in the town square.  A post office has been in operation in Kamrar since 1882.

Geography
Kamrar is located at  (42.391944, -93.728715).

Demographics

2010 census
At the 2010 census there were 199 people in 82 households, including 45 families, in the city. The racial makup of the city was 96.5% White, 2.0% Asian, and 1.5% from two or more races.

Of the 82 households 29.3% had children under the age of 18 living with them, 45.1% were married couples living together, 6.1% had a female householder with no husband present, 3.7% had a male householder with no wife present, and 45.1% were non-families. 32.9% of households were one person and 12.2% were one person aged 65 or older. The average household size was 2.43 and the average family size was 3.31.

The median age was 40.5 years. 26.1% of residents were under the age of 18; 3.4% were between the ages of 18 and 24; 26.5% were from 25 to 44; 25% were from 45 to 64; and 18.6% were 65 or older. The gender makeup of the city was 50.8% male and 49.2% female.

2000 census
At the 2000 census there were 229 people in 91 households, including 66 families, in the city. The racial makup of the city was 95.63% White, 1.31% Native American, 1.31% Asian, and 1.75% from two or more races. Hispanic or Latino of any race were 0.44%.

Of the 91 households 34.1% had children under the age of 18 living with them, 56.0% were married couples living together, 12.1% had a female householder with no husband present, and 26.4% were non-families. 24.2% of households were one person and 13.2% were one person aged 65 or older. The average household size was 2.52 and the average family size was 2.93.

The age distribution was 26.2% under the age of 18, 7.4% from 18 to 24, 29.7% from 25 to 44, 18.8% from 45 to 64, and 17.9% 65 or older. The median age was 37 years. For every 100 females, there were 112.0 males. For every 100 females age 18 and over, there were 108.6 males.

The median household income was $37,188 and the median family income  was $41,071. Males had a median income of $30,500 versus $21,964 for females. The per capita income for the city was $15,892. About 3.0% of families and 3.1% of the population were below the poverty line, including none of those under the age of eighteen or sixty five or over.

Education
It is within the Webster City Community School District. It was formerly in the Northeast Hamilton Community School District, until it merged into the Webster City district on July 1, 2019.

References

Cities in Iowa
Cities in Hamilton County, Iowa